152 mm howitzer M1909/30 was a Soviet 152.4 mm (6 inch) howitzer, a modernization of the 152 mm howitzer M1909, initially designed by Schneider. It was the most numerous 152 mm howitzer employed by Red Army in World War II.

Development and production history
From the late 1920s the RKKA sought to upgrade its World War I-era artillery pieces. One of the modernized weapons was the 152 mm howitzer M1909, initially designed by the French arms manufacturer Schneider. After a number of experiments it was determined that the muzzle velocity of the piece could be increased to about 395 m/s (further increase could result in a damage to the carriage). In 1930 at the Bolshevik Plant, the gun was experimentally fitted with a muzzle brake.

In 1930-1931, the Perm plant developed a modernization project. Initially, the only element of the project was lengthening the chamber to 340 mm (upgraded barrels received a mark "lengthened chamber"). In late production pieces minor changes in breechblock, cradle and elevation mechanism were introduced. Some pieces also had their wooden wheels replaced by steel ones with rubber tires. The modernized weapon was officially adopted as 152-mm howitzer model 1909/30.

The M1909/30 was a typical short-barrel howitzer, intended mostly for shooting with elevations from +20° to +41°, using separately loaded ammunition. The gun had interrupted screw breechblock; hydraulic recoil buffer and hydro-pneumatic recuperator were both mounted under the barrel. The carriage was of single trail type with limited traverse and, typically, unsprung wooden wheels (some pieces produced from 1937 had metal wheels with solid rubber tires). With the gun was issued limber, which had either wooden or metal wheels.

From 1931 to 1941 the Perm plant delivered 2,188 pieces.

Organization and employment

Under the organization of 1939, each rifle division had a howitzer regiment with a 152-mm howitzers battalion (12 pieces). In July 1941 these regiment were cancelled. Same fate befell 152-mm howitzers battalions of motorized and armored divisions.

Corps artillery units didn't employ 152-mm howitzers early in the war (they did use howitzer-guns ML-20); but from late 1943 the recreated corps artillery included a regiment consisted of five batteries (totaling 20 pieces), equipped, along with other types, with 152-mm howitzers. By 1 June 1944, there were 192 such pieces in corps artillery.

Reserve of the Main Command included howitzer regiments (48 pieces) and heavy howitzer brigades (32 pieces), sometimes organized into artillery divisions.

The howitzer was used by the RKKA in the Battle of Khalkhin Gol and in the Winter War. At the outbreak of the German-Soviet War the M1909/30 was still the most numerous 152-mm howitzer in Soviet service. On 1 June 1941, the RKKA possessed about 2,500 pieces, about twice as much as the newer M-10s, which were soon removed from production. Although from 1943 the M1909/30 was again being gradually replaced, this time by D-1, it was still in service by the end of the war.

A number of guns of this type fell into the hands of Wehrmacht in 1941-42; these were adopted as 15,2 cm sFH 445(r). Germans also produced ammunition for these guns. Most of the pieces were assigned to coastal artillery.

Finnish Army captured 14 pieces during the Winter War, and 85 more early in the Continuation War. The guns were actively used in combat. As a training weapon, the M1909/30 remained in Finnish service until the 1980s.

Summary

The M1909/30 was a relatively minor upgrade of a World War I-era howitzer, which did not address the main flaws of the latter, namely:
 Limited towing speed due to unsprung wheels
 Limited elevation and very small traverse
A short barrel meant short range, less than that of its main adversaries, such as the German 15 cm sFH 18 (8.8 km vs 13.3 km). Low muzzle velocity and small traverse also made the gun helpless against enemy armor.

On the other side, the M1909/30 was rugged and reliable. It was also relatively light and could be set up for combat in 30–40 seconds. Thanks to it, the howitzer was well liked in the RKKA.

In 1930 the Soviet Union still was not ready for development and mass production of modern artillery, so the upgrade of old guns was a reasonable decision.

Ammunition
When set to fragmentation action, the OF-530 produced fragments which covered an area 70 m wide and 30 m deep. When set to HE action, the exploding shell produced a crater about 3.5 m in diameter and about 1.2 m deep.

Surviving pieces
The gun can be seen:
 In Museum of Artillery and Engineering Forces, Saint Petersburg, Russia.
 In Artillery Museum in Hämeenlinna, Finland.
 The Cannons at Torp Museum in Ingå, Finland

Notes

References
 Shunkov V. N. - The Weapons of the Red Army, Mn. Harvest, 1999 (Шунков В. Н. - Оружие Красной Армии. — Мн.: Харвест, 1999.) 
Shirokorad A. B. - Encyclopedia of the Soviet Artillery - Mn. Harvest, 2000 (Широкорад А. Б. - Энциклопедия отечественной артиллерии. — Мн.: Харвест, 2000.)
Shirokorad A. B. - The God of War of the Third Reich - M. AST, 2002 (Широкорад А. Б. - Бог войны Третьего рейха. — М.,ООО Издательство АСТ, 2002.)
Ivanov A. - Artillery of the USSR in Second World War - SPb Neva, 2003 (Иванов А. - Артиллерия СССР во Второй Мировой войне. — СПб., Издательский дом Нева, 2003.)
Isaev A. - Antisuvorov - 2004 (Исаев A. - Антисуворов - 2004)
Kolomiets M. - The Battle of River Khalkhin-Gol - "Frontovaya Illustratsiya" magazine, no. 2, 2002 (М.Коломиец. - Бои у реки Халхин-Гол. - журнал «Фронтовая иллюстрация», №2, 2002)
http://www.soldat.ru/doc/mobilization/mob/table17.html
Heavy howitzers of the Finnish Army 1918-45 at Jaegerplatoon.net

External links

World War II artillery of the Soviet Union
152 mm artillery
Motovilikha Plants products
Military equipment introduced in the 1930s